Zeitgeist is an American contemporary classical music group based in Saint Paul, Minnesota. It was founded in 1977.

In 1986, the group comprised Jay Johnson and Joseph Holmquist (percussion), Robert Samarotto (clarinet and saxophone), and Gregory Theisen (piano), and played a piece they had commissioned from Frederic Rzewski two years before.

Discography
1993 - If Tigers Were Clouds. Innova.
1994 - Intuitive Leaps: Zeitgeist plays Terry Riley. Sony Music Entertainment.
1995 - A Decade: Zeitgeist Plays Rzewski. O.O. Discs.

References

External links
Zeitgeist website, accessed 16 February 2010

Contemporary classical music ensembles
Musical groups from Minnesota
Musical groups established in 1977
Culture of Saint Paul, Minnesota